Sakkarai Devan is a 1993 Indian Tamil-language action drama film, directed by J. Panneer and produced by A. S. Ibrahim Rowther. The film stars Vijayakanth, Sukanya, Kanaka and M. N. Nambiar. It was released on 10 July 1993.

Plot 

Sakkarai Devan makes and sells jaggery. On a visit to a neighbouring village, he falls in love with Sarasu, on whom the village landlord Vaiga Perumal had already cust his eye. Sarasu widowed brother Vaiyapuri is arrested following an altercation with the landlord over his sister. Dhanam, an orphan, given refuge by Sakkarai, realising her love is one-sided, marries Vaiyapuri. Sakkarai popularity with the villagers and his attempts to unite them against the landlord invite the evil man's ire.

Cast 

Vijayakanth as Sakkarai Devan
Sukanya as Sarasu
Kanaka as Dhanam
M. N. Nambiar as Vaiyapuri Sarasu's grandfather
Nassar as Vaiyapuri
Mohan Natarajan as Vairaperumal
Thyagu as Ponnambalam
R. Sundarrajan as Appu
Gandhimathi as Sakkarai Devan's mother
Senthil
Vadivelu
C. K. Saraswathi
Baby Monisha as Revathi

Production 
The story of Sakkarai Devan was written by R. Selvaraj. Selvaraj revealed when he visited sugarcane plants in Alanganallur, it reminded him of sugarcane plants owned by his grand father which prompted him to write a screenplay based on this backdrop. R. V. Udayakumar was supposed to direct this film but due to some reasons he left the film and he was replaced by debutant J. Panneer, who earlier assisted Aabavanan making his directorial debut. Selvaraj felt the film felt short of the taste they created after Udayakumar left the film.

Soundtrack 
The music was composed by Ilaiyaraaja, with lyrics by Vaali.

Reception 
The Indian Express wrote "Despite the story being an oft-repeated one, Panneer's narration is fairly neat and his handling of the subject confident". New Straits Times wrote "Sakkarai Devan should go down well with Vijayakanth's fans".

References

External links 
 

1990s Tamil-language films
1993 action drama films
1993 directorial debut films
1993 films
Films scored by Ilaiyaraaja
Indian action drama films